Raymond Gerhardt Hunthausen (August 21, 1921 – July 22, 2018) was an American prelate of the Catholic Church. He served as bishop of the Diocese of Helena in Montana from 1962 to 1975 and as archbishop of the Archdiocese of Seattle in Washington State from 1975 to 1991.

Biography

Early life and education 
The oldest of seven children, Raymond Hunthausen was born in Anaconda, Montana, to Anthony Gerhardt and Edna Marie (née Tuchscherer) Hunthausen. His parents owned and operated a local grocery store. He grew up helping with the grocery business and working in the Tuchscherer brewery.

Nicknamed "Dutch", Hunthausen received his early education from the Ursuline nuns at the parochial school, and excelled both academically and athletically during high school.

Hunthausen attended Carroll College in Helena, majoring in chemistry and graduating cum laude in 1943. He considered pursuing a career as a chemical engineer or as a fighter pilot for the United States Air Force. However, he was persuaded by Bernard Topel, his spiritual director and mathematics professor at Carroll who later became Bishop of Spokane, to enter the priesthood. Hunthausen began his studies at St. Edward Seminary in Kenmore, Washington, in the fall of 1943.

Priesthood 
Hunthausen was ordained a priest by Bishop Joseph Gilmore on June 1, 1946. He returned to Carroll College, where he served as a professor of chemistry (1946–57) and a football and basketball coach (1953–57). In 1953 he earned a master's degree in chemistry from the University of Notre Dame. Hunthausen served as president of Carroll College from 1957 to 1962. He was named a domestic prelate in 1958.

Bishop of Helena 
On July 8, 1962, Hunthausen was appointed the sixth Bishop of Helena by Pope John XXIII. He received his episcopal consecration on the following August 30 from Archbishop Egidio Vagnozzi, with Bishops Bernard Topel and William Condon serving as co-consecrators. As bishop of Helena, Hunthausen was a council father at all four sessions of the Second Vatican Council. He was the newest and youngest American bishop at the start of the council.

Starting in 1976, Hunthausen worked with Call to Action and sought to implement their program. His tenure as bishop of Helena was marked by increased lay involvement in church matters, the establishment of a mission in Guatemala, the closure of several Catholic elementary and high schools, and the strengthening of religious education programs.

Archbishop of Seattle
Hunthausen was appointed Archbishop of Seattle, Washington by Pope Paul VI in 1975. In 1982, Hunthausen withheld half of his income tax to protest the stockpiling of nuclear weapons and the Trident missile program which had a base nearby, in Puget Sound.  In a speech, he said, "Trident is the Auschwitz of Puget Sound." This tax resistance prompted the U.S. Internal Revenue Service to garnish his wages.

Church investigation
As a result of the complaints surrounding Hunthausen's alleged deviations from church doctrine, in 1983 the Vatican authorized Cardinal Ratzinger, Prefect of the Congregation for the Doctrine of the Faith, to launch an investigation. Archbishop (later Cardinal) James Hickey of Washington, DC, was named apostolic visitor to the Archdiocese of Seattle. Hickey's delegation met with Hunthausen and others to investigate his administrative and pastoral practices. The investigation concluded that Hunthausen had exercised "weak doctrinal leadership" in a number of areas, including allowing children to receive the sacrament of Communion without first having received the sacrament of penance.

Donald Wuerl, later archbishop of Washington, was controversially named an auxiliary bishop with special powers. According to Thomas Bokenkotter, "A resolution of the affair was finally announced by the Vatican in April after it accepted the report of a commission that recommended that Hunthausen's authority be restored and a coadjutor bishop be appointed. Hunthausen stoutly maintains that his archdiocese has remained fundamentally the same and was never in violation of Vatican doctrine; nor has he had to alter the general direction of his ministry or compromise his liberal beliefs." Thomas Murphy, Bishop of Great Falls–Billings was appointed coadjutor bishop in 1987.

Hunthausen is remembered most for his support of the poor and disenfranchised. He was also an advocate for the youth and encouraged better catechesis in Catholic parishes and Catholic parochial schools despite waning enrollment. In 1985, he helped establish the Institute for Theological Studies at Seattle University, which in 1996 evolved into the School of Theology and Ministry.

Retirement and legacy 
On August 21, 1991, Pope John Paul II accepted Hunthausen's resignation as archbishop of Seattle.  He then moved to Helena, Montana, to live with his brother, Jack Hunthausen. Raymond Hunthausen continued to hear confessions once a week in East Helena, Montana, and led retreats in the Diocese of Helena. 

On July 22, 2018, Raymond Hunthausen died in his home in Helena at age 96. He is the second archbishop to be interred in the crypt at St. James Cathedral.

Awards

 The 1982 Thomas Merton Award  by the Thomas Merton Center for Peace and Justice

 Election to the National Association of Intercollegiate Athletics Collegiate Hall of Fame

References

Additional sources 
John A. McCoy, A Still and Quiet Conscience: The Archbishop who Challenged a Pope, a President, and a Church, Orbis Books, 2015

External links
 "Funeral Homily", August 3, 2018
 

1921 births
2018 deaths
20th-century Roman Catholic archbishops in the United States
American tax resisters
Roman Catholic archbishops of Seattle
Carroll College (Montana) alumni
Carroll Fighting Saints football coaches
Carroll Fighting Saints men's basketball coaches
Participants in the Second Vatican Council
Roman Catholic bishops of Helena
Seattle University people
People from Anaconda, Montana